Gabriele De Nard (born 3 November 1974) is an Italian male long-distance runner who won three national championships.

Biography
He competed at eight editions of the IAAF World Cross Country Championships, and seventeen editions of the European Cross Country Championships winning four medals with the national team (his best results at individual level was a fourth place).

He is married with the Italian long-distance runner Federica Dal Ri.

References

External links
 

1974 births
Living people
Italian male long-distance runners
Athletics competitors of Fiamme Gialle
Italian male cross country runners